Chickamin Glacier is in the  U.S. state of Washington. Chickamin Glacier is separated from Dome Glacier to the south and Dana Glacier to the west by arêtes.

See also
List of glaciers in the United States

References

Glaciers of the North Cascades
Glaciers of Chelan County, Washington
Glaciers of Washington (state)